Master and Man is a 1929 British drama film directed by George A. Cooper and starring Anne Grey, Henri De Vries and Olaf Hytten. It was based on the play Master and Man by George Robert Sims and Henry Pettitt. It was made at Isleworth Studios.

Plot
A manager of a motor works is sacked for being too old, leading him into a bitter dispute with his former employer.

Cast
 Henri De Vries as Richard Waring
 Anne Grey as Celia Waring
 Humberston Wright as Thomas Blount
 Olaf Hytten as Lord Overbury
 Maurice Braddell as Dick Waring
 Mary Brough as Mrs. Wilkes
 Betty Siddons as Dorothy Blount
 Frank Stanmore as Wilkes
 Winifred Evans

References

External links

1929 films
British silent feature films
British drama films
1929 drama films
Films directed by George A. Cooper
Films shot at Isleworth Studios
British black-and-white films
1920s English-language films
1920s British films
Silent drama films